FRACTRAN is a Turing-complete esoteric programming language invented by the mathematician John Conway. A FRACTRAN program is an ordered list of positive fractions together with an initial positive integer input n. The program is run by updating the integer n as follows:
for the first fraction f in the list for which nf is an integer, replace n by nf
repeat this rule until no fraction in the list produces an integer when multiplied by n, then halt.

 gives the following FRACTRAN program, called PRIMEGAME, which finds successive prime numbers:

Starting with n=2, this FRACTRAN program generates the following sequence of integers:

 2, 15, 825, 725, 1925, 2275, 425, 390, 330, 290, 770, ... 

After 2, this sequence contains the following powers of 2:

 

The exponent part of these powers of two are primes, 2, 3, 5, etc.

Understanding a FRACTRAN program 
A FRACTRAN program can be seen as a type of register machine where the registers are stored in prime exponents in the argument n.

Using Gödel numbering, a positive integer n can encode an arbitrary number of arbitrarily large positive integer variables. The value of each variable is encoded as the exponent of a prime number in the prime factorization of the integer. For example, the integer

represents a register state in which one variable (which we will call v2) holds the value 2 and two other variables (v3 and v5) hold the value 1. All other variables hold the value 0.

A FRACTRAN program is an ordered list of positive fractions. Each fraction represents an instruction that tests one or more variables, represented by the prime factors of its denominator. For example:

tests v2 and v5. For example:

Since the FRACTRAN program is just a list of fractions, these test-decrement-increment instructions are the only allowed instructions in the FRACTRAN language. In addition the following restrictions apply:

Each time an instruction is executed, the variables that are tested are also decremented.
The same variable cannot be both decremented and incremented in a single instruction (otherwise the fraction representing that instruction would not be in its lowest terms). Therefore each FRACTRAN instruction consumes variables as it tests them.
It is not possible for a FRACTRAN instruction to directly test if a variable is 0 (However, an indirect test can be implemented by creating a default instruction that is placed after other instructions that test a particular variable.).

Creating simple programs

Addition 
The simplest FRACTRAN program is a single instruction such as

This program can be represented as a (very simple) algorithm as follows:

It therefore adds two integers together.

Multiplication 
We can create a "multiplier" by "looping" through the "adder". In order to do this we need to introduce states into our algorithm. This algorithm will take a number  and produce :

State B is a loop that adds v3 to v5 and also moves v3 to v7, and state A is an outer control loop that repeats the loop in state B v2 times. State A also restores the value of v3 from v7 after the loop in state B has completed.

We can implement states using new variables as state indicators. The state indicators for state B will be v11 and v13. Note that we require two state control indicators for one loop; a primary flag (v11) and a secondary flag (v13). Because each indicator is consumed whenever it is tested, we need a secondary indicator to say "continue in the current state"; this secondary indicator is swapped back to the primary indicator in the next instruction, and the loop continues.

Adding FRACTRAN state indicators and instructions to the multiplication algorithm table, we have:

When we write out the FRACTRAN instructions, we must put the state A instructions last, because state A has no state indicators - it is the default state if no state indicators are set. So as a FRACTRAN program, the multiplier becomes:

With input 2a3b this program produces output 5ab.

Subtraction and division 
In a similar way, we can create a FRACTRAN "subtractor", and repeated subtractions allow us to create a "quotient and remainder" algorithm as follows:

Writing out the FRACTRAN program, we have:

and input 2n3d11 produces output 5q7r where n = qd + r and 0 ≤ r  < d.

Conway's prime algorithm 
Conway's prime generating algorithm above is essentially a quotient and remainder algorithm within two loops. Given input of the form  where 0 ≤ m  < n, the algorithm tries to divide n+1 by each number from n down to 1, until it finds the largest number k that is a divisor of n+1. It then returns 2n+1 7k-1 and repeats. The only times that the sequence of state numbers generated by the algorithm produces a power of 2 is when k is 1 (so that the exponent of 7 is 0), which only occurs if the exponent of 2 is a prime. A step-by-step explanation of Conway's algorithm can be found in Havil (2007).

For this program, reaching the prime number 2, 3, 5, 7... requires respectively 19, 69, 281, 710,... steps . 

A variant of Conway's program also exists, which differs from the above version by two fractions:

This variant is a little faster: reaching 2, 3, 5, 7... takes it 19, 69, 280, 707... steps . A single iteration of this program, checking a particular number N for primeness, takes the following number of steps:

In 1999, Devin Kilminster demonstrated a shorter, ten-instruction program: 

For the initial input n = 10 successive primes are generated by subsequent powers of 10.

Other examples 
The following FRACTRAN program:

calculates the Hamming weight H(a) of the binary expansion of a i.e. the number of 1s in the binary expansion of a. Given input 2a, its output is 13H(a). The program can be analysed as follows:

Notes

See also 
 One-instruction set computer
 Collatz conjecture

References

External links 

Lecture from John Conway: "Fractran: A Ridiculous Logical Language"
"Prime Number Pathology: Fractran"
 
Prime Number Pathology
FRACTRAN - (Esolang wiki)
Ruby implementation and example programs
Project Euler Problem 308
"Building Fizzbuzz in Fractran from the Bottom Up"
Chris Lomont, "A Universal FRACTRAN Interpreter in FRACTRAN"

Models of computation
Esoteric programming languages
Recreational mathematics